Helena O'Neill is a former camogie player, winner of the B+I Star of the Year award in 1974 and All Ireland medals in 1974, 1976 and 1977.

Career
A member of the Presentation Secondary School, Kilkenny team that won the secondary schools colleges championship in 1969 and 1970 she played with St Paul's camogie club, based in Kilkenny city, winning All Ireland club medals in 1969, 1971, 1975 and 1977. She was first selected for the Kilkenny and Leinster senior teams in 1970, scoring two goals in Kilkenny's breakthrough first Leinster title in 1970 and four goals for Leinster in the Gael Linn Cup final.

All Ireland success
She was centre half back, play maker and free-taker for Kilkenny's first All Ireland success in 1974, sending a long free directly to the net in the replay and for the follow-up successes in 1976 and 1977. She retired after Kilkenny's defeat to Antrim in 1979.

References

External links
 Camogie.ie Official Camogie Association Website
 On The Ball Official Camogie Magazine Issue 1 and issue 2

Living people
Kilkenny camogie players
Year of birth missing (living people)